Patricia Offel (born 19 December 1971) is a Ghanaian table tennis player. She competed in the women's singles event at the 1988 Summer Olympics.

References

External links
 

1971 births
Living people
Ghanaian female table tennis players
Olympic table tennis players of Ghana
Table tennis players at the 1988 Summer Olympics
Place of birth missing (living people)